Sandy Hodge may refer to:

 Sandy Hodge (Royal Navy officer) (1916–1997), recipient of the Empire Gallantry Medal, later exchanged for the George Cross
 Sandy Hodge (footballer), Scottish footballer